Eastern Buyeo, also rendered as Dongbuyeo or Eastern Fuyu, was an ancient kingdom that developed from Northern Buyeo (Northern Fuyu), until it was conquered by Goguryeo. According to the Samguk Sagi, it was established when the Buyeo king Hae Buru moved the capital eastward by the sea.

Founding
According to the Samguk Sagi and other accounts, the kingdom of Eastern Buyeo originated from Northern Buyeo, and relocated to the land near to Okjeo.

Hae Buru found a golden frog-like child under a large rock. Hae Buru named the child Geumwa, meaning golden frog, and later made him crown prince.

Early Eastern Buyeo
Geumwa became king after Hae Buru's death. Not long after, King Geumwa reversed his father's submission to Bukbuyeo and declared himself "Supreme king" and gave the title posthumously to his father, Hae Buru. At the Ubal river, near southern of Taebaek Mountain, Geumwa met Lady Yuhwa, who was the disowned daughter Habaek, the god of the Amnok River or, according to an alternative interpretation, the sun god Haebak. and brought her back to his palace. She was impregnated by sunlight and laid an egg, from which hatched Jumong.

Geumwa's two sons resented Jumong, and although Geumwa tried to protect him, Jumong ran away to Jolbon Buyeo, where he later established Goguryeo.

Geumwa's eldest son Daeso became the next King. King Daeso attacked Goguryeo during the reign of its second ruler, King Yuri. Goguryeo's third ruler King Daemusin attacked Dongbuyeo and killed King Daeso. After internal strife, Dongbuyeo fell, and its territory was absorbed into Goguryeo.

Later Eastern Buyeo
According to other records, Jumong was from Bukbuyeo, not Dongbuyeo. According to the Gwanggaeto stele, Dongbuyeo was a tributary of Goguryeo. Dongbuyeo was briefly revived by a small state established around 285 by refugees of Buyeo. This state was conquered by King Gwanggaeto the Great of Goguryeo in 410.

Although the chronology is inconsistent with the Samguk Sagi, one legend says Wutae, the father of the Baekje's founder and 1st ruler, Onjo, was a son of Hae Buru.

See also
Buyeo
Galsa Buyeo
Goguryeo

References

Buyeo
History of Manchuria
Former countries in Chinese history
Former countries in Korean history
Former countries in East Asia
Former monarchies of East Asia